Gymnothorax longinquus is a moray eel found in coral reefs in the southwest Pacific Ocean. It is commonly known as the yellow-gilled reef-eel, yellow-gilled moray, brown moray-eel, or long moray.

References

longinquus
Fish described in 1948